Bolshoi Ussuriysky Island ( Bol'shoy Ussuriyskiy Ostrov), or Heixiazi Island (lit. "black blind island"), is a sedimentary island at the confluence of the Ussuri and Amur rivers. It is divided between the People's Republic of China (PRC) and Russia. It has an area of about 327 to 350 km2 and is bounded closely by Yinlong Island (Tarabarov Island), and over ninety islets (in Chinese, Heixiazi may refer only to the large island or to the island group collectively). Its position at the confluence of the Amur and the Ussuri and right next to the major Russian city of Khabarovsk, has given it great strategic importance.

History

The Convention of Peking 1860 stipulated that the boundary between Russia and China lay along the Amur and Ussuri rivers. As such the island at the confluence of the two rivers was Chinese. Until 2004, Bolshoy Ussuriyskiy Island was the site of a territorial dispute between China and Russia. The Soviet Union forcefully occupied Bolshoy Ussuriyskiy and Yinlong Islands in 1929 in the wake of a Russo/Manchurian conflict, but this was not accepted by China. While Russia governed the islands as a part of Khabarovsk Krai, China claimed them as a part of Fuyuan County, Heilongjiang province; the easternmost part of China.

The difficulty in settling this dispute involved competing interests between Russia and China.  To settle the boundary along the lines claimed by China would have subjected settled parts of the city of Khabarovsk to the range of artillery emplaced on Heixiazi. However, by occupying the entire island Russia controlled the entire Amur and Ussuri waterway and gave Khabarovsk a comfortable buffer zone. During their control of the island Russia refused navigational access to the Amur and Ussuri to Chinese ships.

On October 14, 2004, the Complementary Agreement between the People's Republic of China and the Russian Federation on the Eastern Section of the China-Russia Boundary was signed, in which Russia agreed to relinquish control over Yinlong Island and around half of Bolshoy Ussuriysky. About 170 square kilometres of Bolshoy Ussuriysky was transferred to China, while the rest will remain in Russia's jurisdiction. In return, China agreed to drop all territorial claims to the remainder of Bolshoy Ussuriysky kept by Russia and received the right to navigate ships along the main channel of the Amur.

Agreement between Russia and People's Republic of China

In 2005, the Russian Federal Assembly and the Chinese National People's Congress approved the agreement. On July 21, 2008, an agreement was signed in Beijing by the Chinese and Russian Foreign Ministers, that finalized the border demarcation and formally ended negotiations. Under the agreement, Russia would transfer approximately 174 km2 of territory to China. The transfer took place on October 14, 2008. The area transferred to China is largely uninhabited. The Chinese part of the island is situated in the district of Fuyuan City in the Province of Heilongjiang, China's easternmost county.

Controversy
The agreement has met with controversy on both sides of the border. In May 2005, Cossacks in Khabarovsk demonstrated against the loss of half of Bolshoy Ussuriysky. In return, some Chinese commentators, especially the media in Hong Kong, Taiwan and overseas which are outside the control of PRC government, criticized the PRC government for signing the agreement, which they regarded as sealing as permanent the loss of former Chinese territory, such as Outer Manchuria, to Russia.

The government of the  Republic of China in Taiwan (ROC) has never recognized border treaties signed by the PRC with other countries. Therefore, the ROC still formally claims all parts of the Heixiazi Islands.

According to a 2002 study by Akihiro Iwashita, a Japanese specialist on Slavic relations, “Most of Khabarovsk’s local elites, in particular military, considered the islands of strategic importance since they fenced off Khabarovsk from China. If the border was drawn, relying upon the ‘main channel principle’, the two islands would have passed to China. This is why the Soviet Union insisted on the legal exceptionality of the two islands in its negotiations with China during the late 1980s, while strengthening its de facto control of these islands".

Geography

The total area of these territories in the Khabarovsk region is approximately 340 square kilometres.

The Chinese section of the island is part of Fuyuan, Heilongjiang. The Russian section is part of Khabarovsky District of Khabarovsk Krai.

Nature Reserve

In 2015, PRC registered the island as a nature reserve to protect biodiversity to host 505 species of flora and 351 species of fauna, 44 of those are nationally protected species, including siberian tiger. There is a "bear park" to contain black bears on the island.

See also
1991 Sino-Soviet Border Agreement
List of divided islands
Abagaitu Islet

Notes

References

External links
Google Maps satellite image of Heixiazi/Bolshoy Ussuriysky and Yinlong islands
黑瞎子島紅太陽升起處 一個島兩個國 中國進行式 20170514 

River islands of China
River islands of Russia
Geography of Northeast Asia
Divided regions
China–Soviet Union relations
International islands
China–Russia border
Islands of Khabarovsk Krai
Islands of Heilongjiang
Former disputed islands
Territorial disputes of the Soviet Union
Territorial disputes of China
Nature reserves in China